Sijihong Town is an urban town in Yuanjiang, Yiyang, Hunan Province, People's Republic of China.

Administrative division
The town is divided into nine villages and one community, the following areas: Sijihong Community, Wuxing Village, Sijihong Village, Yuque Village, Changzheng Village, Xianfeng Village, Yangquehong Village, Dongfeng Village, Hongqi Village, and Anxin Village (四季红社区、五星村、四季红村、玉鹊村、长征村、先锋村、阳雀洪村、东风村、红旗村、安心村).

References

External links

Divisions of Yuanjiang